HDMS Christianus Sixtus (1733) was a three-deck 90-gun ship-of-the-line designed to be the flagship of the Danish fleet, and named after the monarch of the time, King Christian VI

The ship's history
Designed by K N Benstrup in his role as senior fabrikmester, and built and launched in Copenhagen, the ship was immediately a source of contention as she drew a greater depth (by some six inches) than planned.  This was due to the use of poorly seasoned timber which was thus heavier than calculated.  As much of Danish naval strategy was planned around the relatively shallower waters of the Kattegat and Great Belt, compared with the deeper North Sea and Baltic, this could be a problem.
The controversy grew as blame was cast on Benstrup, and other senior officers played out their animosities and conspired to court martial the designer.
As an expensive capital ship Christian Sextus appears never to have actually left harbour, and was fully commissioned only once in her 35 years of life.  This was in 1743 when there was a question over succession to the Swedish throne.

Notes

References

Citations

Nielsen E. - Danish Military History website - Major Danish Warships Built at the Holmen Shipyard 1692-1744
Royal Danish Naval Museum - Christianus Sixtus - for original plans click "vis" on this link.
Royal Danish Naval Museum - List of Danish Warships  
Topsøe-Jensen Th.: Knud Benstrup in Danish Biographical Leksikon, 3. edition, Gyldendal 1979-84. accessed 27 August 2019

Ships of the line of the Royal Dano-Norwegian Navy
Ships built in Copenhagen